The Judge J. C. Kerwin House, at 516 E. Forest Ave. in Neenah, Wisconsin, United States, was built in 1885.  It is a two-story Queen Anne-style house built of masonry.  It has a three two-story bays and it has a verandah across south and east facades with a semi-circular pavilion and turreted roof at the corner.

It was listed on the National Register of Historic Places in 1996.

Its building is attributed to Ernest F. Wieckert, and it was perhaps designed by Wieckert.

References

Houses completed in 1885
Houses on the National Register of Historic Places in Wisconsin
Queen Anne architecture in Wisconsin
Houses in Winnebago County, Wisconsin
National Register of Historic Places in Winnebago County, Wisconsin